Jonathan Michael Meloan (born July 11, 1984) is an American former pitcher in professional baseball. He played in Major League Baseball for the Los Angeles Dodgers, Cleveland Indians and Oakland Athletics.

Early life
He was an academic all-district honoree at James E. Taylor High School in Katy, Texas. Meloan is also a member of the National Honor Society.

In three seasons with Arizona, he compiled a record of 24–4 in 30 starts. In 2003, he played collegiate summer baseball in the Cape Cod Baseball League for the Yarmouth-Dennis Red Sox.

Professional career

Los Angeles Dodgers
He was drafted by the Los Angeles Dodgers in the 5th round of the 2005 Major League Baseball draft and made his professional debut for the Ogden Raptors in mid-season, going 0-2, 3.69 ERA in 16 appearances, 6 of them as a starter. Primarily a starter in college, he was converted to a relief pitcher at Ogden. His maximum-effort delivery and his 92–94 mph fastball with a pair of strikeout breaking balls led to his consideration as a closer. In , he saw action with the Columbus Catfish, Vero Beach Dodgers and Jacksonville Suns. For the  season, Meloan began the year with Double-A Jacksonville, compiling a 5–2 record with a terrific 2.18 ERA in 35 relief appearances and notching 19 saves to be selected to the Southern League All-Star team.  He won the post-season "Double-A Relief Pitcher of the Year" Award. After the all-star break, he was promoted to Triple-A Las Vegas and he was recalled to the Dodgers on September 1, 2007. He made his Major League debut for the Dodgers that night against the San Diego Padres, working two innings of relief. He wound up pitching in five games for the Dodgers after his September call-up, working 7.1 innings and finishing with an 11.05 ERA. On July 26, Meloan was traded to the Cleveland Indians along with minor league catcher Carlos Santana for infielder Casey Blake.

Cleveland Indians
On July 26, Meloan was traded to the Cleveland Indians along with minor league catcher Carlos Santana for infielder Casey Blake. In 2009, Meloan had pitched 44 innings in Triple-A (for the Columbus Clippers) compiling a 0-0 record, with one save in 25 appearances with a 5.52 ERA before being traded on July 2, 2009. He was traded to the Tampa Bay Rays for pitcher Winston Abreu.

Tampa Bay Rays
On July 2, 2009, he was traded to the Tampa Bay Rays for pitcher Winston Abreu. Meloan was designated for assignment by the Rays on August 7,

Pittsburgh Pirates
Meloan was claimed off waivers by the Pirates on August 12, 2009.  On August 31, 2009 he was again designated for assignment.

Oakland Athletics
He was claimed off waivers by the Oakland Athletics on September 2, 2009. After missing all of the  season due to Tommy John Surgery, Meloan Rehabed at Kansas City Sports Rehabilitation & Physical Therapy and was outrighted to Triple-A Sacramento. The A's released Meloan in October 2011.

2012
Meloan agreed to sign with the Texas Rangers on March 3, 2012, but the Rangers released Meloan on March 31, before he could play a game in the organization. Meloan started the 2012 season with the Long Island Ducks. The Yankees signed Meloan in June 2012. He then returned to the Long Island Ducks in 2014.

References

External links

Baseball players from Texas
People from Katy, Texas
Major League Baseball pitchers
Los Angeles Dodgers players
Cleveland Indians players
Oakland Athletics players
Ogden Raptors players
Columbus Catfish players
Vero Beach Dodgers players
Jacksonville Suns players
Las Vegas 51s players
Buffalo Bisons (minor league) players
Sacramento River Cats players
Columbus Clippers players
Durham Bulls players
Indianapolis Indians players
Midland RockHounds players
Long Island Ducks players
1984 births
Living people
Scranton/Wilkes-Barre Yankees players
Sportspeople from Harris County, Texas
Trenton Thunder players
Mesa Solar Sox players
Caribes de Anzoátegui players
American expatriate baseball players in Venezuela
Yarmouth–Dennis Red Sox players
Arizona Wildcats baseball players